Pancratium foetidum is a species of plant in the family Amaryllidaceae.

Sources

References 

foetidum